Ja'Corey Brooks (born October 31, 2001) is an American football wide receiver for the Alabama Crimson Tide.

Early life and high school
Brooks grew up in Miami, Florida and initially attended Booker T. Washington Senior High School. He caught 99 passes for 1,281 yards and 18 touchdowns as junior to help Washington win a state championship. After the season, Brooks transferred to IMG Academy in Bradenton, Florida. Brooks committed to play college football at Alabama.

College career
Brooks mostly saw playing time on special teams at the beginning of his freshman season. He caught a nine yard pass for his first collegiate reception in Alabama's 59-3 win over New Mexico State Aggies on November 13, 2021. Brooks saw his first significant playing time against Auburn and caught two passes for 49 yards and a touchdown in Alabama's 24-22 overtime win. He started in place on injured receiver John Metchie III in the 2021 Cotton Bowl Classic against Cincinnati and had four receptions for 66 yards and a touchdown in a 27-6 win.

References

External links
Alabama Crimson Tide bio

Living people
Players of American football from Florida
American football wide receivers
Alabama Crimson Tide football players
IMG Academy alumni
2001 births